National road 1 is a route in the Polish national road network. The highway connects the northern and southern regions of Poland, running from Gdańsk to Zwardoń at the Slovak border, traversing the Pomeranian, Kuyavian-Pomeranian, Łódź and Silesian voivodeships. It has four bridges over the Vistula river. Most of the national road 1 is a component of European highway E75.

From Gdańsk to Piotrków Trybunalski, the road has a motorway standard and is marked as A1 motorway.

From Piotrków Trybunalski to Katowice, it is part of the Gierkówka route - a dual carriageway road constructed in the 1970s not up to motorway standard, marked as National road 1. As of 2019, the reconstruction of its northern half (from Tuszyn to Częstochowa) into A1 motorway has started, forcing closure of one carriageway and diverting the whole traffic to the second carriageway for the time of reconstruction.

From Podwarpie near Katowice to Zwardoń the road partially has an expressway standard marked as S1 (the other parts are marked as National road 1).

Major cities and towns along the route 
 Gdańsk (national road 7)
 Toruń (national road 15, 80)
 Włocławek (national road 62)
 Krośniewice (national road 92)
 Zgierz (national road 71)
 Łódź (national road 14, 72)
 Piotrków Trybunalski (national road 8, 12, 91)
 Radomsko (national road 42)
 Częstochowa (national road 43, 46, 91)
 Siewierz (national road 78)
 Dąbrowa Górnicza (national road 94)
 Sosnowiec
 Mysłowice (national road 4)
 Tychy (national road 44, 86)
 Bielsko-Biała (national road 52)
 Zwardoń, border with Slovakia

01